Florian Maurice (born 20 January 1974) is a French football executive and former professional footballer who played as a striker. He most notably won the 1998 Coupe de France and Coupe de la Ligue with French team Paris Saint-Germain. He played six games and scored a single goal for the France national team, also representing his nation at the 1996 Summer Olympics. He is currently the technical director of Ligue 1 club Rennes.

Career
Born in Sainte-Foy-lès-Lyon, Rhône, Florian Maurice started playing youth football with local top-flight team Olympique Lyonnais in 1986. A great hope in French football, Maurice was touted as the new Jean-Pierre Papin. He was included in Lyonnais' senior squad for the Ligue 1 championship in the 1991–92 season, but did not make his Ligue 1 debut until August 1992. His national breakthrough came during the 1994–95 season, when he scored 15 league goals. In the 1995–96 season, he scored 18 league goals for Lyonnais and took part in both the 1996 European Under-21 Championship and 1996 Summer Olympics tournaments.

He made his debut for the France national team in August 1996, under national manager Aimé Jacquet. However, Maurice's progress was halted during the 1996–97 season, when he suffered a ruptured achilles tendon and went through several months of recovery. In the summer 1997, he moved from Lyonnais to league rivals Paris Saint-Germain in a transfer deal worth FF 41 million. He was a part of the Paris SG team which won both the 1998 Coupe de France and Coupe de la Ligue trophies. He played a single season at Paris SG, scoring seven league goals, before he moved on to Olympique de Marseille in the summer 1998.

In his first season at Marseille, Maurice recovered his goal scoring ability, and netted 14 league goals. Marseille reached the final of the international 1999 UEFA Cup tournament, but lost 0–3 to Parma AC from Italy. The following two years at Marseille, Maurice suffered several minor injuries, and could not establish himself in the Marseille starting line-up. He played his last match for the France national team in November 1999, scoring his only national team goal in a 3–0 win against Croatia, before being dropped by new national team manager Roger Lemerre.

He moved abroad in the summer 2001, to play for Celta de Vigo in Spain. After a single, unsuccessful year at the club, he returned to France to play for Ligue 1 club SC Bastia. He had moderate success at Bastia, but when his contract expired in the summer 2004, only newly promoted team FC Istres were in need of his services. He failed to score any goals for the relegation battling Istres team, and left the club in January 2005. He moved to Ligue 2 club LB Châteauroux, where he played until he retired in September 2005.

Later career
From 2009 until 2020, Maurice worked as a scout for Lyon. In June 2020, he was hired by Rennes as technical director.

Honours
Paris Saint-Germain
Coupe de France: 1997–98
Coupe de la Ligue: 1997–98

Individual
Ligue 1 Young Player of the Year: 1995

References

External links
 
 
 FFF profile 

1974 births
Living people
People from Sainte-Foy-lès-Lyon
Association football forwards
French footballers
France international footballers
France under-21 international footballers
Footballers at the 1996 Summer Olympics
Olympic footballers of France
Olympique Lyonnais players
Paris Saint-Germain F.C. players
Olympique de Marseille players
La Liga players
Ligue 1 players
RC Celta de Vigo players
SC Bastia players
FC Istres players
LB Châteauroux players
French expatriate footballers
French expatriate sportspeople in Spain
Expatriate footballers in Spain
Sportspeople from Lyon Metropolis
Footballers from Auvergne-Rhône-Alpes